The Ocampo Pagoda Mansion is a mansion which resembles a pagoda configuration in Quiapo, Manila, Philippines. It was commissioned by the Jose Mariano Ocampo and was constructed from 1936 to 1941 on the eve of Japanese invasion of the Philippines.

History 

The three-storey structure with a seven-storey tower at the northwestern corner was his vision of a Japanese castle which was located behind his mansion across the estero. The Japanese-themed structure was inspired by his admiration of Japan for proving that an Asian country could modernize and equal to developments and progress in the West. He was aided by two Filipino engineers and two Japanese overseers. It was timely that the Japanese-inspired structure was during the colonization of the Japanese soldiers. Because of the high-grade reinforced concrete that was used in the building, it became the shelter for the neighbors during air battles between Japanese and American planes in World War II.

Architecture 

Though Japanese-inspired, the Pagoda is a combination of styles. The base of the four-sided tower is decorated on two sides with juxtaposed Japanese dormer gables with ornate bargeboards. The reinforced concrete gables do not carry any ridge but acts as an ornament to the tower's base. On top of the interwoven gables is the upper part of the tower which resembles medieval Western. It is crowned by battlements with defensive, teeth-like crenellations. Machicolations are located beneath the battlements. There are cantilevered turrets at the corners of the tower. The pyramidal red-tiled roofs including the turret crowns outline the structure in the skyline.

According to Victorino Manalo, a museum expert and director of the Metropolitan Museum of Manila, there is an elaborate world of symbols present in the structure. The most important of these symbols is Ocampo's personal emblem, the owl which is carved under the main gable of the lower tower.

References

External links

Houses in Metro Manila
Buildings and structures in Quiapo, Manila